Waheed Akanni Oseni (born 17 January 1988) is a Nigerian footballer who plays as a centre back or defensive midfielder.

Club career
He started his career in Nigeria, at Sunshine Stars and in 2006 moved to Beitar Jerusalem. In January 2008 he transferred to Apollon Limassol, where he signed a contract for an initial of 6 months with an option to extend it for 3 years. Apollon exercised the option and extended his contract until 30 June 2012. He then moved to Saudi Professional League club Al-Taawon.

References

1988 births
Living people
Nigerian footballers
Cypriot First Division players
Sunshine Stars F.C. players
Beitar Jerusalem F.C. players
Apollon Limassol FC players
Ethnikos Achna FC players
Al-Taawoun FC players
Najran SC players
Expatriate footballers in Israel
Expatriate footballers in Cyprus
Expatriate footballers in Saudi Arabia
Nigerian expatriate footballers
Association football midfielders
Saudi Professional League players